United Nations Security Council Resolution 117, adopted on September 6, 1956, after the death of Judge Hsu Mo of the International Court of Justice the Council decided that the election to fill the vacancy for the rest of Judge Mo's term would take place during the eleventh session of the General Assembly.

The resolution was adopted without vote.

See also
List of United Nations Security Council Resolutions 101 to 200 (1953–1965)

References
Text of the Resolution at undocs.org

External links
 

 0117
 0117
September 1956 events